This is a list of the bird species recorded in Azerbaijan. The avifauna of Azerbaijan include a total of 422 species.

This list's taxonomic treatment (designation and sequence of orders, families and species) and nomenclature (common and scientific names) follow the conventions of The Clements Checklist of Birds of the World, 2022 edition. The family accounts at the beginning of each heading reflect this taxonomy, as do the species counts found in each family account. Accidental species are included in the total species count for Azerbaijan.

The following tags have been used to highlight several categories. The commonly occurring native species do not fall into any of these categories.

 (A) Accidental - a species that rarely or accidentally occurs in Azerbaijan
 (I) Introduced - a species introduced to Azerbaijan as a consequence, direct or indirect, of human actions

Ducks, geese, and waterfowl
Order: AnseriformesFamily: Anatidae

Anatidae includes the ducks and most duck-like waterfowl, such as geese and swans. These birds are adapted to an aquatic existence with webbed feet, flattened bills, and feathers that are excellent at shedding water due to an oily coating.

Snow goose, Anser caerulescens (A)
Graylag goose, Anser anser
Greater white-fronted goose, Anser albifrons
Lesser white-fronted goose, Anser erythropus
Taiga bean-goose, Anser fabalis (A)
Tundra bean-goose, Anser serrirostris (A)
Red-breasted goose, Branta ruficollis
Mute swan, Cygnus olor
Tundra swan, Cygnus columbianus
Whooper swan, Cygnus cygnus
Ruddy shelduck, Tadorna ferruginea
Common shelduck, Tadorna tadorna
Garganey, Spatula querquedula
Northern shoveler, Spatula clypeata
Gadwall, Mareca strepera
Eurasian wigeon, Mareca penelope
Mallard, Anas platyrhynchos
Northern pintail, Anas acuta
Green-winged teal, Anas crecca
Marbled teal, Marmaronetta angustirostris
Red-crested pochard, Netta rufina
Common pochard, Aythya ferina
Ferruginous duck, Aythya nyroca
Tufted duck, Aythya fuligula
Greater scaup, Aythya marila
Velvet scoter, Melanitta fusca
Common scoter, Melanitta nigra (A)
Long-tailed duck, Clangula hyemalis (A)
Common goldeneye, Bucephala clangula
Smew, Mergellus albellus
Common merganser, Mergus merganser
Red-breasted merganser, Mergus serrator
Ruddy duck, Oxyura jamaicensis (I)
White-headed duck, Oxyura leucocephala

Pheasants, grouse, and allies
Order: GalliformesFamily: Phasianidae

The Phasianidae are a family of terrestrial birds. In general, they are plump (although they vary in size) and have broad, relatively short wings.

Caucasian grouse, Lyrurus mlokosiewiczi
Gray partridge, Perdix perdix
Ring-necked pheasant, Phasianus colchicus
Black francolin, Francolinus francolinus
Caucasian snowcock, Tetraogallus caucasicus
Caspian snowcock, Tetraogallus caspius
See-see partridge, Ammoperdix griseogularis (A)
Common quail, Coturnix coturnix
Chukar, Alectoris chukar

Flamingos
Order: PhoenicopteriformesFamily: Phoenicopteridae

Flamingos filter-feed on shellfish and algae. Their oddly shaped beaks are specially adapted to separate mud and silt from the food they consume and, uniquely, are used upside-down.

Greater flamingo, Phoenicopterus roseus

Grebes
Order: PodicipediformesFamily: Podicipedidae

Grebes are small to medium-large freshwater diving birds. They have lobed toes and are excellent swimmers and divers. However, they have their feet placed far back on the body, making them quite ungainly on land.

Little grebe, Tachybaptus ruficollis
Horned grebe, Podiceps auritus
Red-necked grebe, Podiceps grisegena
Great crested grebe, Podiceps cristatus
Eared grebe, Podiceps nigricollis

Pigeons and doves
Order: ColumbiformesFamily: Columbidae

Pigeons and doves are stout-bodied birds with short necks and short slender bills with a fleshy cere.

Rock pigeon, Columba livia
Stock dove, Columba oenas
Common wood-pigeon, Columba palumbus
European turtle-dove, Streptopelia turtur
Oriental turtle-dove, Streptopelia orientalis (A)
Eurasian collared-dove, Streptopelia decaocto
Laughing dove, Streptopelia senegalensis
Namaqua dove, Oena capensis (A)

Sandgrouse
Order: PterocliformesFamily: Pteroclidae

Sandgrouse have small, pigeon like heads and necks, but sturdy compact bodies. They have long pointed wings and sometimes tails and a fast direct flight. Flocks fly to watering holes at dawn and dusk. Their legs are feathered down to the toes.

Pallas's sandgrouse, Syrrhaptes paradoxus (A)
Pin-tailed sandgrouse, Pterocles alchata (A)
Black-bellied sandgrouse, Pterocles orientalis

Bustards
Order: OtidiformesFamily: Otididae

Bustards are large terrestrial birds mainly associated with dry open country and steppes in the Old World. They are omnivorous and nest on the ground. They walk steadily on strong legs and big toes, pecking for food as they go. They have long broad wings with "fingered" wingtips and striking patterns in flight. Many have interesting mating displays.

Great bustard, Otis tarda
Macqueen's bustard, Chlamydotis macqueenii
Little bustard, Tetrax tetrax

Cuckoos
Order: CuculiformesFamily: Cuculidae

The family Cuculidae includes cuckoos, roadrunners and anis. These birds are of variable size with slender bodies, long tails and strong legs.

Great spotted cuckoo, Clamator glandarius (A)
Common cuckoo, Cuculus canorus

Nightjars and allies
Order: CaprimulgiformesFamily: Caprimulgidae

Nightjars are medium-sized nocturnal birds that usually nest on the ground. They have long wings, short legs and very short bills. Most have small feet, of little use for walking, and long pointed wings. Their soft plumage is camouflaged to resemble bark or leaves.

Eurasian nightjar, Caprimulgus europaeus

Swifts
Order: CaprimulgiformesFamily: Apodidae

Swifts are small birds which spend the majority of their lives flying. These birds have very short legs and never settle voluntarily on the ground, perching instead only on vertical surfaces. Many swifts have long swept-back wings which resemble a crescent or boomerang.

Alpine swift, Apus melba
Common swift, Apus apus
Little swift, Apus affinis

Rails, gallinules, and coots
Order: GruiformesFamily: Rallidae

Rallidae is a large family of small to medium-sized birds which includes the rails, crakes, coots and gallinules. Typically they inhabit dense vegetation in damp environments near lakes, swamps or rivers. In general they are shy and secretive birds, making them difficult to observe. Most species have strong legs and long toes which are well adapted to soft uneven surfaces. They tend to have short, rounded wings and to be weak fliers.

Water rail, Rallus aquaticus
Corn crake, Crex crex
Spotted crake, Porzana porzana
Eurasian moorhen, Gallinula chloropus
Eurasian coot, Fulica atra
Gray-headed swamphen, Porphyrio poliocephalus
Little crake, Zapornia parva
Baillon's crake, Zapornia pusilla

Cranes
Order: GruiformesFamily: Gruidae

Cranes are large, long-legged and long-necked birds. Unlike the similar-looking but unrelated herons, cranes fly with necks outstretched, not pulled back. Most have elaborate and noisy courting displays or "dances".

Demoiselle crane, Anthropoides virgo
Siberian crane, 	Leucogeranus leucogeranus (A)
Common crane, Grus grus

Thick-knees
Order: CharadriiformesFamily: Burhinidae

The thick-knees are a group of largely tropical waders in the family Burhinidae. They are found worldwide within the tropical zone, with some species also breeding in temperate Europe and Australia. They are medium to large waders with strong black or yellow-black bills, large yellow eyes and cryptic plumage. Despite being classed as waders, most species have a preference for arid or semi-arid habitats.

Eurasian thick-knee, Burhinus oedicnemus

Stilts and avocets
Order: CharadriiformesFamily: Recurvirostridae

Recurvirostridae is a family of large wading birds, which includes the avocets and stilts. The avocets have long legs and long up-curved bills. The stilts have extremely long legs and long, thin, straight bills.

Black-winged stilt, Himantopus himantopus
Pied avocet, Recurvirostra avosetta

Oystercatchers
Order: CharadriiformesFamily: Haematopodidae

The oystercatchers are large and noisy plover-like birds, with strong bills used for smashing or prising open molluscs.

Eurasian oystercatcher, Haematopus ostralegus

Plovers and lapwings
Order: CharadriiformesFamily: Charadriidae

The family Charadriidae includes the plovers, dotterels and lapwings. They are small to medium-sized birds with compact bodies, short, thick necks and long, usually pointed, wings. They are found in open country worldwide, mostly in habitats near water.

Black-bellied plover, Pluvialis squatarola
European golden-plover, Pluvialis apricaria
Pacific golden-plover, Pluvialis fulva (A)
Northern lapwing, Vanellus vanellus
Spur-winged lapwing, Vanellus spinosus (A)
Red-wattled lapwing, Vanellus indicus (A)
Sociable lapwing, Vanellus gregarius
White-tailed lapwing, Vanellus leucurus
Greater sand-plover, Charadrius leschenaultii
Caspian plover, Charadrius asiaticus
Kentish plover, Charadrius alexandrinus
Common ringed plover, Charadrius hiaticula
Little ringed plover, Charadrius dubius
Eurasian dotterel, Charadrius morinellus

Sandpipers and allies
Order: CharadriiformesFamily: Scolopacidae

Scolopacidae is a large diverse family of small to medium-sized shorebirds including the sandpipers, curlews, godwits, shanks, tattlers, woodcocks, snipes, dowitchers and phalaropes. The majority of these species eat small invertebrates picked out of the mud or soil. Variation in length of legs and bills enables multiple species to feed in the same habitat, particularly on the coast, without direct competition for food.

Whimbrel, Numenius phaeopus
Slender-billed curlew, Numenius tenuirostris (A)
Eurasian curlew, Numenius arquata
Bar-tailed godwit, Limosa lapponica
Black-tailed godwit, Limosa limosa
Ruddy turnstone, Arenaria interpres
Red knot, Calidris canutus
Ruff, Calidris pugnax
Broad-billed sandpiper, Calidris falcinellus
Sharp-tailed sandpiper, Calidris acuminata (A)
Curlew sandpiper, Calidris ferruginea
Temminck's stint, Calidris temminckii
Sanderling, Calidris alba
Dunlin, Calidris alpina
Baird's sandpiper, Calidris bairdii (A)
Little stint, Calidris minuta
White-rumped sandpiper, Calidris fuscicollis (A)
Pectoral sandpiper, Calidris melanotos (A)
Long-billed dowitcher, Limnodromus scolopaceus (A)
Jack snipe, Lymnocryptes minimus
Eurasian woodcock, Scolopax rusticola
Great snipe, Gallinago media
Common snipe, Gallinago gallinago
Terek sandpiper, Xenus cinereus
Red-necked phalarope, Phalaropus lobatus
Red phalarope, Phalaropus fulicarius (A)
Common sandpiper, Actitis hypoleucos
Green sandpiper, Tringa ochropus
Spotted redshank, Tringa erythropus
Common greenshank, Tringa nebularia
Marsh sandpiper, Tringa stagnatilis
Wood sandpiper, Tringa glareola
Common redshank, Tringa totanus

Pratincoles and coursers
Order: CharadriiformesFamily: Glareolidae

Glareolidae is a family of wading birds comprising the pratincoles, which have short legs, long pointed wings and long forked tails, and the coursers, which have long legs, short wings and long, pointed bills which curve downwards.

Cream-colored courser, Cursorius cursor
Collared pratincole, Glareola pratincola
Oriental pratincole, Glareola maldivarum
Black-winged pratincole, Glareola nordmanni

Skuas and jaegers
Order: CharadriiformesFamily: Stercorariidae

The family Stercorariidae are, in general, medium to large birds, typically with grey or brown plumage, often with white markings on the wings. They nest on the ground in temperate and arctic regions and are long-distance migrants.

Pomarine jaeger, Stercorarius pomarinus (A)
Parasitic jaeger, Stercorarius parasiticus

Gulls, terns, and skimmers
Order: CharadriiformesFamily: Laridae

Laridae is a family of medium to large seabirds, the gulls, terns, and skimmers. Gulls are typically grey or white, often with black markings on the head or wings. They have stout, longish bills and webbed feet. Terns are a group of generally medium to large seabirds typically with grey or white plumage, often with black markings on the head. Most terns hunt fish by diving but some pick insects off the surface of fresh water. Terns are generally long-lived birds, with several species known to live in excess of 30 years.

Black-legged kittiwake, Rissa tridactyla (A)
Slender-billed gull, Chroicocephalus genei
Black-headed gull, Chroicocephalus ridibundus
Little gull, Hydrocoloeus minutus
Mediterranean gull, Ichthyaetus melanocephalus
Pallas's gull, Ichthyaetus ichthyaetus
Common gull, Larus canus
Herring gull, Larus argentatus (A)
Yellow-legged gull, Larus michahellis
Caspian gull, Larus cachinnansArmenian gull, Larus armenicusLesser black-backed gull, Larus fuscusGlaucous gull, Larus hyperboreus (A)
Little tern, Sternula albifronsGull-billed tern, Gelochelidon niloticaCaspian tern, Hydroprogne caspiaBlack tern, Chlidonias nigerWhite-winged tern, Chlidonias leucopterusWhiskered tern, Chlidonias hybridaCommon tern, Sterna hirundoSandwich tern, Thalasseus sandvicensisLoons
Order: GaviiformesFamily: Gaviidae

Divers, known as loons in the US, are a group of aquatic birds found in many parts of North America and northern Europe. They are the size of a large duck or small goose, which they somewhat resemble when swimming, but to which they are completely unrelated.

Red-throated loon, Gavia stellataArctic loon, Gavia arcticaStorks
Order: CiconiiformesFamily: Ciconiidae

Storks are large, long-legged, long-necked, wading birds with long, stout bills. Storks are mute, but bill-clattering is an important mode of communication at the nest. Their nests can be large and may be reused for many years. Many species are migratory.

Black stork, Ciconia nigraWhite stork, Ciconia ciconiaCormorants and shags
Order: SuliformesFamily: Phalacrocoracidae

Phalacrocoracidae is a family of medium to large coastal, fish-eating seabirds that includes cormorants and shags. Plumage colouration varies, with the majority having mainly dark plumage, some species being black-and-white and a few being colourful.

Pygmy cormorant, Microcarbo pygmeusGreat cormorant, Phalacrocorax carboPelicans
Order: PelecaniformesFamily: Pelecanidae

Pelicans are large water birds with a distinctive pouch under their beak. As with other members of the order Pelecaniformes, they have webbed feet with four toes.

Great white pelican, Pelecanus onocrotalusDalmatian pelican, Pelecanus crispusHerons, egrets, and bitterns
Order: PelecaniformesFamily: Ardeidae

The family Ardeidae contains the bitterns, herons and egrets. Herons and egrets are medium to large wading birds with long necks and legs. Bitterns tend to be shorter necked and more wary. Members of Ardeidae fly with their necks retracted, unlike other long-necked birds such as storks, ibises and spoonbills.

Great bittern, Botaurus stellarisLittle bittern, Ixobrychus minutusGray heron, Ardea cinereaPurple heron, Ardea purpureaGreat egret, Ardea albaLittle egret, Egretta garzettaCattle egret, Bubulcus ibisSquacco heron, Ardeola ralloidesBlack-crowned night-heron, Nycticorax nycticoraxIbises and spoonbills
Order: PelecaniformesFamily: Threskiornithidae

Threskiornithidae is a family of large terrestrial and wading birds which includes the ibises and spoonbills. They have long, broad wings with 11 primary and about 20 secondary feathers. They are strong fliers and despite their size and weight, very capable soarers.

Glossy ibis, Plegadis falcinellusAfrican sacred ibis, Threskiornis aethiopicusEurasian spoonbill, Platalea leucorodiaOsprey
Order: AccipitriformesFamily: Pandionidae

The family Pandionidae contains only one species, the osprey. The osprey is a medium-large raptor which is a specialist fish-eater with a worldwide distribution.

Osprey, Pandion haliaetusHawks, eagles, and kites
Order: AccipitriformesFamily: Accipitridae

Accipitridae is a family of birds of prey, which includes hawks, eagles, kites, harriers and Old World vultures. These birds have powerful hooked beaks for tearing flesh from their prey, strong legs, powerful talons and keen eyesight.

Black-winged kite, Elanus caeruleus (A)
Bearded vulture, Gypaetus barbatusEgyptian vulture, Neophron percnopterusEuropean honey-buzzard, Pernis apivorusOriental honey-buzzard, Pernis ptilorhynchus (A)
Cinereous vulture, Aegypius monachusEurasian griffon, Gyps fulvusShort-toed snake-eagle, Circaetus gallicusLesser spotted eagle, Clanga pomarinaGreater spotted eagle, Clanga clangaBooted eagle, Hieraaetus pennatusSteppe eagle, Aquila nipalensisImperial eagle, Aquila heliacaGolden eagle, Aquila chrysaetosBonelli's eagle, Aquila fasciataEurasian marsh-harrier, Circus aeruginosusHen harrier, Circus cyaneusPallid harrier, Circus macrourusMontagu's harrier, Circus pygargusShikra, Accipiter badiusLevant sparrowhawk, Accipiter brevipesEurasian sparrowhawk, Accipiter nisusNorthern goshawk, Accipiter gentilisRed kite, Milvus milvusBlack kite, Milvus migransWhite-tailed eagle, Haliaeetus albicillaPallas's fish-eagle, Haliaeetus leucoryphus (A)
Rough-legged hawk, Buteo lagopusCommon buzzard, Buteo buteoLong-legged buzzard, Buteo rufinusBarn-owls
Order: StrigiformesFamily: Tytonidae

Barn-owls are medium to large owls with large heads and characteristic heart-shaped faces. They have long strong legs with powerful talons.

Barn owl, Tyto albaOwls
Order: StrigiformesFamily: Strigidae

The typical owls are small to large solitary nocturnal birds of prey. They have large forward-facing eyes and ears, a hawk-like beak and a conspicuous circle of feathers around each eye called a facial disk.

Eurasian scops-owl, Otus scopsEurasian eagle-owl, Bubo buboLittle owl, Athene noctuaTawny owl, Strix alucoLong-eared owl, Asio otusShort-eared owl, Asio flammeusBoreal owl, Aegolius funereusHoopoes
Order: BucerotiformesFamily: Upupidae

Hoopoes have black, white and orangey-pink colouring with a large erectile crest on their head.

Eurasian hoopoe, Upupa epopsKingfishers
Order: CoraciiformesFamily: Alcedinidae

Kingfishers are medium-sized birds with large heads, long, pointed bills, short legs and stubby tails.

Common kingfisher, Alcedo atthisWhite-throated kingfisher, Halcyon smyrnensisBee-eaters
Order: CoraciiformesFamily: Meropidae

The bee-eaters are a group of near passerine birds in the family Meropidae. Most species are found in Africa but others occur in southern Europe, Madagascar, Australia and New Guinea. They are characterised by richly coloured plumage, slender bodies and usually elongated central tail feathers. All are colourful and have long downturned bills and pointed wings, which give them a swallow-like appearance when seen from afar.

Blue-cheeked bee-eater, Merops persicusEuropean bee-eater, Merops apiasterRollers
Order: CoraciiformesFamily: Coraciidae

Rollers resemble crows in size and build, but are more closely related to the kingfishers and bee-eaters. They share the colourful appearance of those groups with blues and browns predominating. The two inner front toes are connected, but the outer toe is not.

European roller, Coracias garrulusWoodpeckers
Order: PiciformesFamily: Picidae

Woodpeckers are small to medium-sized birds with chisel-like beaks, short legs, stiff tails and long tongues used for capturing insects. Some species have feet with two toes pointing forward and two backward, while several species have only three toes. Many woodpeckers have the habit of tapping noisily on tree trunks with their beaks.

Eurasian wryneck, Jynx torquillaMiddle spotted woodpecker, Dendrocoptes mediusWhite-backed woodpecker, Dendrocopos leucotosGreat spotted woodpecker, Dendrocopos majorSyrian woodpecker, Dendrocopos syriacusLesser spotted woodpecker, Dryobates minorEurasian green woodpecker, Picus viridisBlack woodpecker, Dryocopus martiusFalcons and caracaras
Order: FalconiformesFamily: Falconidae

Falconidae is a family of diurnal birds of prey. They differ from hawks, eagles and kites in that they kill with their beaks instead of their talons.

Lesser kestrel, Falco naumanniEurasian kestrel, Falco tinnunculusRed-footed falcon, Falco vespertinusMerlin, Falco columbariusEurasian hobby, Falco subbuteoLanner falcon, Falco biarmicusSaker falcon, Falco cherrugPeregrine falcon, Falco peregrinusOld World parrots
Order: PsittaciformesFamily: Psittaculidae

Characteristic features of parrots include a strong curved bill, an upright stance, strong legs, and clawed zygodactyl feet. Many parrots are vividly colored, and some are multi-colored. Old World parrots are found from Africa east across south and southeast Asia and Oceania to Australia and New Zealand.

Rose-ringed parakeet, Psittacula krameri (A)

Old World orioles
Order: PasseriformesFamily: Oriolidae

The Old World orioles are colourful passerine birds. They are not related to the New World orioles.

Eurasian golden oriole, Oriolus oriolusShrikes
Order: PasseriformesFamily: Laniidae

Shrikes are passerine birds known for their habit of catching other birds and small animals and impaling the uneaten portions of their bodies on thorns. A typical shrike's beak is hooked, like a bird of prey.

Red-backed shrike, Lanius collurioRed-tailed shrike, Lanius phoenicuroidesIsabelline shrike, Lanius isabellinusGreat gray shrike, Lanius excubitorLesser gray shrike, Lanius minorMasked shrike, Lanius nubicusWoodchat shrike, Lanius senatorCrows, jays, and magpies
Order: PasseriformesFamily: Corvidae

The family Corvidae includes crows, ravens, jays, choughs, magpies, treepies, nutcrackers and ground jays. Corvids are above average in size among the Passeriformes, and some of the larger species show high levels of intelligence.

Eurasian jay, Garrulus glandariusEurasian magpie, Pica picaEurasian nutcracker, Nucifraga caryocatactes (A)
Red-billed chough, Pyrrhocorax pyrrhocoraxYellow-billed chough, Pyrrhocorax graculusEurasian jackdaw, Corvus monedulaRook, Corvus frugilegusHooded crow, Corvus cornixCommon raven, Corvus coraxTits, chickadees, and titmice
Order: PasseriformesFamily: Paridae

The Paridae are mainly small stocky woodland species with short stout bills. Some have crests. They are adaptable birds, with a mixed diet including seeds and insects.

Coal tit, Periparus aterCrested tit, Lophophanes cristatusSombre tit, Poecile lugubrisCaspian tit, Poecile hyrcanaEurasian blue tit, Cyanistes caeruleusGreat tit, Parus majorPenduline-tits
Order: PasseriformesFamily: Remizidae

The penduline-tits are a group of small passerine birds related to the true tits. They are insectivores.

Eurasian penduline-tit, Remiz pendulinusBlack-headed penduline-tit, Remiz macronyxLarks
Order: PasseriformesFamily: Alaudidae

Larks are small terrestrial birds with often extravagant songs and display flights. Most larks are fairly dull in appearance. Their food is insects and seeds.

Horned lark, Eremophila alpestrisGreater short-toed lark, Calandrella brachydactylaBimaculated lark, Melanocorypha bimaculataCalandra lark, Melanocorypha calandraBlack lark, Melanocorypha yeltoniensis (A)
Mediterranean short-toed lark, Alaudala rufescens (A)
Turkestan short-toed lark, Alaudala heineiWood lark, Lullula arboreaWhite-winged lark, Alauda leucopteraEurasian skylark, Alauda arvensisOriental skylark, Alauda gulgula (A)
Crested lark, Galerida cristataBearded reedling
Order: PasseriformesFamily: Panuridae

This species, the only one in its family, is found in reed beds throughout temperate Europe and Asia.

Bearded reedling, Panurus biarmicusReed warblers and allies 
Order: PasseriformesFamily: Acrocephalidae

The members of this family are usually rather large for "warblers". Most are rather plain olivaceous brown above with much yellow to beige below. They are usually found in open woodland, reedbeds, or tall grass. The family occurs mostly in southern to western Eurasia and surroundings, but it also ranges far into the Pacific, with some species in Africa.

Booted warbler, Iduna caligataEastern olivaceous warbler, Iduna pallidaUpcher's warbler, Hippolais languidaIcterine warbler, Hippolais icterinaMoustached warbler, Acrocephalus melanopogonSedge warbler, Acrocephalus schoenobaenusPaddyfield warbler, Acrocephalus agricolaBlyth's reed warbler, Acrocephalus dumetorumMarsh warbler, Acrocephalus palustrisEurasian reed warbler, Acrocephalus scirpaceusGreat reed warbler, Acrocephalus arundinaceusGrassbirds and allies
Order: PasseriformesFamily: Locustellidae

Locustellidae are a family of small insectivorous songbirds found mainly in Eurasia, Africa, and the Australian region. They are smallish birds with tails that are usually long and pointed, and tend to be drab brownish or buffy all over.

River warbler, Locustella fluviatilisSavi's warbler, Locustella luscinioidesCommon grasshopper-warbler, Locustella naeviaSwallows
Order: PasseriformesFamily: Hirundinidae

The family Hirundinidae is adapted to aerial feeding. They have a slender streamlined body, long pointed wings and a short bill with a wide gape. The feet are adapted to perching rather than walking, and the front toes are partially joined at the base.

Bank swallow, Riparia ripariaEurasian crag-martin, Ptyonoprogne rupestrisBarn swallow, Hirundo rusticaRed-rumped swallow, Cecropis dauricaCommon house-martin, Delichon urbicumLeaf warblers
Order: PasseriformesFamily: Phylloscopidae

Leaf warblers are a family of small insectivorous birds found mostly in Eurasia and ranging into Wallacea and Africa. The species are of various sizes, often green-plumaged above and yellow below, or more subdued with greyish-green to greyish-brown colors.

Wood warbler, Phylloscopus sibilatrixYellow-browed warbler, Phylloscopus inornatus (A)
Pallas's leaf warbler, Phylloscopus proregulus (A)
Radde's warbler, Phylloscopus schwarziDusky warbler, Phylloscopus fuscatus (A)
Willow warbler, Phylloscopus trochilusMountain chiffchaff, Phylloscopus sindianusCommon chiffchaff, Phylloscopus collybitaGreen warbler, Phylloscopus nitidusGreenish warbler, Phylloscopus trochiloides (A)
Arctic warbler, Phylloscopus borealisBush warblers and allies
Order: PasseriformesFamily: Scotocercidae

The members of this family are found throughout Africa, Asia, and Polynesia. Their taxonomy is in flux, and some authorities place some genera in other families.

Scrub warbler, Scotocerca inquieta (A)
Cetti's warbler, Cettia cettiLong-tailed tits
Order: PasseriformesFamily: Aegithalidae

Long-tailed tits are a group of small passerine birds with medium to long tails. They make woven bag nests in trees. Most eat a mixed diet which includes insects.

Long-tailed tit, Aegithalos caudatusSylviid warblers, parrotbills, and allies
Order: PasseriformesFamily: Sylviidae

The family Sylviidae is a group of small insectivorous passerine birds. They mainly occur as breeding species, as the common name implies, in Europe, Asia and, to a lesser extent, Africa. Most are of generally undistinguished appearance, but many have distinctive songs.

Eurasian blackcap, Sylvia atricapillaGarden warbler, Sylvia borinBarred warbler, Curruca nisoriaLesser whitethroat, Curruca currucaEastern Orphean warbler, Curruca crassirostrisMenetries's warbler, Curruca mystaceaGreater whitethroat, Curruca communisKinglets
Order: PasseriformesFamily: Regulidae

The kinglets, also called crests, are a small group of birds often included in the Old World warblers, but frequently given family status because they also resemble the titmice.

Goldcrest, Regulus regulusWallcreeper
Order: PasseriformesFamily: Tichodromidae

The wallcreeper is a small bird related to the nuthatch family, which has stunning crimson, grey and black plumage.

Wallcreeper, Tichodroma murariaNuthatches
Order: PasseriformesFamily: Sittidae

Nuthatches are small woodland birds. They have the unusual ability to climb down trees head first, unlike other birds which can only go upwards. Nuthatches have big heads, short tails and powerful bills and feet.

Eurasian nuthatch, Sitta europaeaWestern rock nuthatch, Sitta neumayerEastern rock nuthatch, Sitta tephronotaTreecreepers
Order: PasseriformesFamily: Certhiidae

Treecreepers are small woodland birds, brown above and white below. They have thin pointed down-curved bills, which they use to extricate insects from bark. They have stiff tail feathers, like woodpeckers, which they use to support themselves on vertical trees.

Eurasian treecreeper, Certhia familiarisWrens
Order: PasseriformesFamily: Troglodytidae

The wrens are mainly small and inconspicuous except for their loud songs. These birds have short wings and thin down-turned bills. Several species often hold their tails upright. All are insectivorous.

Eurasian wren, Troglodytes troglodytesDippers
Order: PasseriformesFamily: Cinclidae

Dippers are a group of perching birds whose habitat includes aquatic environments in the Americas, Europe and Asia. They are named for their bobbing or dipping movements.

White-throated dipper, Cinclus cinclusStarlings
Order: PasseriformesFamily: Sturnidae

Starlings are small to medium-sized passerine birds. Their flight is strong and direct and they are very gregarious. Their preferred habitat is fairly open country. They eat insects and fruit. Plumage is typically dark with a metallic sheen.

European starling, Sturnus vulgarisRosy starling, Pastor roseusThrushes and allies
Order: PasseriformesFamily: Turdidae

The thrushes are a group of passerine birds that occur mainly in the Old World. They are plump, soft plumaged, small to medium-sized insectivores or sometimes omnivores, often feeding on the ground. Many have attractive songs.

Mistle thrush, Turdus viscivorusSong thrush, Turdus philomelosRedwing, Turdus iliacusEurasian blackbird, Turdus merulaFieldfare, Turdus pilarisRing ouzel, Turdus torquatusBlack-throated thrush, Turdus atrogularisOld World flycatchers
Order: PasseriformesFamily: Muscicapidae

Old World flycatchers are a large group of small passerine birds native to the Old World. They are mainly small arboreal insectivores. The appearance of these birds is highly varied, but they mostly have weak songs and harsh calls.

Spotted flycatcher, Muscicapa striataRufous-tailed scrub-robin, Cercotrichas galactotesEuropean robin, Erithacus rubeculaWhite-throated robin, Irania gutturalisThrush nightingale, Luscinia lusciniaCommon nightingale, Luscinia megarhynchosBluethroat, Luscinia svecicaRed-flanked bluetail, Tarsiger cyanurus (A) 
Taiga flycatcher, Ficedula albicillaRed-breasted flycatcher, Ficedula parvaSemicollared flycatcher, Ficedula semitorquataEuropean pied flycatcher, Ficedula hypoleucaCommon redstart, Phoenicurus phoenicurusWhite-winged redstart, 	Phoenicurus erythrogastrusBlack redstart, Phoenicurus ochrurosRufous-tailed rock-thrush, Monticola saxatilisBlue rock-thrush, Monticola solitariusWhinchat, Saxicola rubetraEuropean stonechat, Saxicola rubicolaSiberian stonechat, Saxicola maurusNorthern wheatear, Oenanthe oenantheIsabelline wheatear, Oenanthe isabellinaDesert wheatear, Oenanthe desertiFinsch's wheatear, Oenanthe finschiiEastern black-eared wheatear, Oenanthe melanoleucaPied wheatear, Oenanthe pleschankaKurdish wheatear, Oenanthe xanthoprymnaPersian wheatear, Oenanthe chrysopygiaWaxwings
Order: PasseriformesFamily: Bombycillidae

The waxwings are a group of passerine birds with soft silky plumage and unique red tips to some of the wing feathers. In the Bohemian and cedar waxwings, these tips look like sealing wax and give the group its name. These are arboreal birds of northern forests. They live on insects in summer and berries in winter.

Bohemian waxwing, Bombycilla garrulus (A)

Hypocolius
Order: PasseriformesFamily: Hypocoliidae

The grey hypocolius is a small Middle Eastern bird with the shape and soft plumage of a waxwing. They are mainly a uniform grey colour except the males have a black triangular mask around their eyes.

Hypocolius, Hypocolius ampelinusAccentors
Order: PasseriformesFamily: Prunellidae

The accentors are in the only bird family, Prunellidae, which is completely endemic to the Palearctic. They are small, fairly drab species superficially similar to sparrows.

Alpine accentor, Prunella collarisRadde's accentor, Prunella ocularisDunnock, Prunella modularisOld World sparrows
Order: PasseriformesFamily: Passeridae

Old World sparrows are small passerine birds. In general, sparrows tend to be small, plump, brown or grey birds with short tails and short powerful beaks. Sparrows are seed eaters, but they also consume small insects.

House sparrow, Passer domesticusSpanish sparrow, Passer hispaniolensisEurasian tree sparrow, Passer montanusRock sparrow, Petronia petroniaPale rockfinch, Carpospiza brachydactylaWhite-winged snowfinch, Montifringilla nivalisWagtails and pipits
Order: PasseriformesFamily: Motacillidae

Motacillidae is a family of small passerine birds with medium to long tails. They include the wagtails, longclaws and pipits. They are slender, ground feeding insectivores of open country.

Gray wagtail, Motacilla cinereaWestern yellow wagtail, Motacilla flavaEastern yellow wagtail, Motacilla tschutschensis (A)
Citrine wagtail, Motacilla citreolaWhite wagtail, Motacilla albaRichard's pipit, Anthus richardiTawny pipit, Anthus campestrisMeadow pipit, Anthus pratensisTree pipit, Anthus trivialisOlive-backed pipit, Anthus hodgsoniRed-throated pipit, Anthus cervinusWater pipit, Anthus spinolettaAmerican pipit, Anthus rubescens (A)

Finches, euphonias, and allies
Order: PasseriformesFamily: Fringillidae

Finches are seed-eating passerine birds, that are small to moderately large and have a strong beak, usually conical and in some species very large. All have twelve tail feathers and nine primaries. These birds have a bouncing flight with alternating bouts of flapping and gliding on closed wings, and most sing well.

Common chaffinch, Fringilla coelebsBrambling, Fringilla montifringillaHawfinch, Coccothraustes coccothraustesCommon rosefinch, Carpodacus erythrinusGreat rosefinch, Carpodacus rubicilla 
Long-tailed rosefinch, Carpodacus sibiricus (A)
Eurasian bullfinch, Pyrrhula pyrrhulaCrimson-winged finch, Rhodopechys sanguineusTrumpeter finch, Bucanetes githagineusMongolian finch, Bucanetes mongolicusDesert finch, Rhodospiza obsoleta (A)
European greenfinch, Chloris chlorisTwite, Linaria flavirostrisEurasian linnet, Linaria cannabinaCommon redpoll, Acanthis flammea (A)
Red crossbill, Loxia curvirostraEuropean goldfinch, Carduelis carduelisEuropean serin, Serinus serinusFire-fronted serin, Serinus pusillusEurasian siskin, Spinus spinusLongspurs and snow buntings
Order: PasseriformesFamily: Calcariidae

The Calcariidae are a group of passerine birds which had been traditionally grouped with the New World sparrows, but differ in a number of respects and are usually found in open grassy areas.

Lapland longspur, Calcarius lapponicus (A)
Snow bunting, Plectrophenax nivalis (A)

Old World buntings
Order: PasseriformesFamily: Emberizidae

The emberizids are a large family of passerine birds. They are seed-eating birds with distinctively shaped bills.  Many emberizid species have distinctive head patterns.

Black-headed bunting, Emberiza melanocephalaRed-headed bunting, Emberiza brunicepsCorn bunting, Emberiza calandraRock bunting, Emberiza ciaYellowhammer, Emberiza citrinellaPine bunting, Emberiza leucocephalosGray-necked bunting, Emberiza buchananiCinereous bunting, Emberiza cineraceaOrtolan bunting, Emberiza hortulanaReed bunting, Emberiza schoeniclusYellow-breasted bunting, Emberiza aureolaLittle bunting, Emberiza pusilla (A)
Rustic bunting, Emberiza rustica''

See also
List of birds
Lists of birds by region

References

External links
Azerbaijan Ornithological Society

Azerbaijan
Azerbaijan
 
Birds
A